The Premier Futsal League of Bosnia and Herzegovina (Bosnian: Premijer futsal liga Bosne i Hercegovine; Премијер футсал лига Босне и Херцеговине) is the top-level futsal league in Bosnia and Herzegovina.  The competition is organized and run by the Football Federation of Bosnia and Herzegovina although clubs have their own organization.

Formation and history
The Premier League was founded in 2013. Since 1994 there have been two leagues based on entity principles with best teams from both taking part in playoff to crown national champion. Later, after UEFA decided to help Bosnia and Herzegovina FA to establish nationwide league played in whole country, the league itself was started in 2013, along with Women's football league (also assisted by UEFA).

Competition format
12 teams take part in the competition. The league is played in two phases. In the first phase teams play each other once in 11 rounds. Top six teams qualify to Championship stage while bottom six teams qualify to Relegation stage. In both second phase stages teams play each other twice on home-away basis so there are 21 rounds (11+10) total. Top team of Championship stage is crowned champion while bottom two teams of Relegation stage are relegated.

In first two season (2013-14 and 2014-15), competition was played in home-away round-robin format. Top team after 22 rounds was crowned champion.

If relegated teams comes from Federation of Bosnia and Herzegovina entity, they will play in First league of Federation of Bosnia and Herzegovina next season; otherwise, if team comes from Republic of Srpska entity, it will take part in First league of Republic of Srpska next season. Relegated teams could be both from same entity. Champions of entity leagues (First League of Federation of Bosnia and Herzegovina; First League of Republika Srpska) are promoted to the Premier league.

Winner of the competition qualifies to UEFA Futsal Cup. Best result in the competition by a team from Bosnia Herzegovina was achieved in 2013-14 edition when Tango reached Elite round (best 16 teams of the competition).

Champions
Listed below are the champions of Premier League.

Before Premier League

Teams

Eight teams are representing Federation of Bosnia and Herzegovina while four are representing Republic of Srpska.

† title holder
‡ promoted

All-time table
Below is the Premier league all-time table, as of 2016-17 season completion. Total of 16 teams played in the competition during four seasons. Two new teams are set for their debut in 2017-18. One team that pulled out of competition in first season, Karaka Mostar, is not counted as all of their matches were annulled.

S - number of seasons; GP - games played; W, D, L - games won, drawn, lost, G+, G- - goals for, against; Pts - points

Season by season positions

External links
 Football Association of Bosnia and Herzegovina official site 
 Futsal League at uefa.com

Futsal in Bosnia and Herzegovina
Bosnia and Herzegovina
Futsal
1994 establishments in Bosnia and Herzegovina
Sports leagues established in 1994